The Roman Catholic Diocese of Santos is a diocese located in the city of Santos in the Ecclesiastical province of São Paulo in Brazil.

History
 4 July 1924: Established as Diocese of Santos from the Metropolitan Archdiocese of São Paulo

Special churches
Minor Basilicas:
Basílica Santo Antônio do Embaré

Bishops
 Bishops of Santos (Roman rite), in reverse chronological order
 Bishop Tarcísio Scaramussa, S.D.B. (2015.05.06 – present); formerly, Coadjutor Bishop of the Diocese under Bishop Braido
 Bishop Jacyr Francisco Braido, C.S. (2000.07.26 – 2015.05.06)
 Bishop David Picão (1966.11.21 – 2000.07.26)
 Bishop Idílio José Soares (1943.06.12 – 1966.11.21)
 Bishop Paulo de Tarso Campos (1935.06.01 - 1941.12.14), appointed Bishop of Campinas; future Archbishop
 Bishop José Maria Perreira Lara (1924.12.18 – 1934.09.28), appointed Bishop of Caratinga, Minas Gerais

Coadjutor bishops
David Picão (1963-1966)
Jacyr Francisco Braido, C.S. (1995-2000)
Tarcísio Scaramussa, S.D.B. (2014-2015)

Auxiliary bishops
Walmor Battú Wichrowski (1958-1960), appointed Bishop of Nova Iguaçu, Rio de Janeiro
José Carlos Castanho de Almeida (1982-1987), appointed Bishop of Itumbiara, Goias

References

 GCatholic.org
 Catholic Hierarchy
 Diocese website (Portuguese)

Roman Catholic dioceses in Brazil
Christian organizations established in 1924
Santos, Roman Catholic Diocese of
Roman Catholic dioceses and prelatures established in the 20th century